An Impossible Crime (Spanish:¿Crimen imposible?) is a 1954 Spanish crime film directed by César Fernández Ardavín and starring José Suárez, Félix Fernández and Silvia Morgan.

Cast
 José Suárez as Alberto  
 Félix Fernández as Antonio Olmeda  
 Silvia Morgan as María  
 Ángel Picazo as Luis Escobedo  
 Francisco Arenzana as Camarero  
 Gérard Tichy as Eugenio Certal  
 Irene Caba Alba as Portera  
 Francisco Sánchez as Agente Garcelán 
 Antonio Abad Ojuel 
 Manuel Amado 
 Manuel Arbó as Inspector jefe  
 Juan Chacot 
 Nani Fernández 
 Manuel Guitián as Guía en museo  
 Luis Moscatelli 
 José G. Rey 
 José Riesgo 
 Salvador Soler Marí 
 Vicente Ávila

References

Bibliography 
 Bentley, Bernard. A Companion to Spanish Cinema. Boydell & Brewer 2008.

External links 
 

1954 crime films
Spanish crime films
1954 films
1950s Spanish-language films
Films directed by César Fernández Ardavín
Spanish black-and-white films
1950s Spanish films